Eccopsis is a genus of moths belonging to the subfamily Olethreutinae of the family Tortricidae.

Species
Eccopsis aegidia (Meyrick, 1932) 
Eccopsis affluens (Meyrick, 1921)  
Eccopsis agassizi Aarvik, 2004
Eccopsis brunneopostica  Razowski & Trematerra, 2010
Eccopsis deprinsi Aarvik, 2004
Eccopsis eltundana  Razowski & Wojtusiak, 2008
Eccopsis encardia Diakonoff, 1983
Eccopsis floreana  Razowski & Landry, 2008
Eccopsis galapagana  Razowski & Landry, 2008
Eccopsis hathra Razowski & Wojtusiak, 2012
Eccopsis heterodon Diakonoff, 1981
Eccopsis incultana (Walker, 1863)  

Eccopsis maschalista (Meyrick, 1932) 
Eccopsis morogoro Aarvik, 2004
Eccopsis nebulana Walsingham, 1891  
Eccopsis ninicecelie Aarvik, 2004
Eccopsis ochrana Aarvik, 2004
 Eccopsis orchlora (Meyrick, 1920)
Eccopsis ofcolacona Razowski, 2008
Eccopsis praecedens Walsingham, 1897  
Eccopsis ptilonota (Meyrick, 1921)  
Eccopsis sequestra Razowski & Wojtusiak, 2012
Eccopsis subincana Razowski & Trematerra, 2010
Eccopsis tucki Aarvik, 2004
Eccopsis wahlbergiana Zeller, 1852

See also
List of Tortricidae genera

References

External links
tortricidae.com

Olethreutini
Tortricidae genera